Nicholas Walker (born January 23, 1990) is a Trinidadian professional footballer.

Career

Early career
Walker played four years of college soccer at Farleigh Dickinson University between 2010 and 2013. Was a two-time all-North Atlantic region first team selection at Fairleigh Dickinson. Was also named 2013 Northeast Conference Defender of the Year as a senior. Walker started 69 of the 71 games he played as a four-year starter for the Knights. He finished his collegiate career with four goals.

Walker also made twelve appearances for USL PDL club Michigan Bucks in 2013.

FC Dallas
On January 21, 2014, Walker was drafted in the third round (43rd overall) of the 2014 MLS SuperDraft by FC Dallas. He signed with Dallas on March 19, 2014.

Walker made his professional debut on June 11, 2014 as an 87th-minute substitute in a 2-2 draw against Portland Timbers.

On August 6, 2014, Walker was loaned to Puerto Rican club Bayamón FC. He scored his first goal in  a Concacaf Champions League match against Club America.

In December 2014, FC Dallas declined the option to sign Walker for the 2015 season.

References

External links 
 

1990 births
Living people
Trinidad and Tobago footballers
Trinidad and Tobago expatriate footballers
Fairleigh Dickinson Knights men's soccer players
Flint City Bucks players
Sportspeople from Port of Spain
FC Dallas players
Bayamón FC players
Association football defenders
Expatriate soccer players in the United States
Expatriate footballers in Puerto Rico
FC Dallas draft picks
USL League Two players
Major League Soccer players